Civic Union is a small Uruguayan political party.

It was founded in 1971 by dissidents of the Christian Democratic Party (PDC) who did not want to join the Frente Amplio alliance. The party delivered a minister of defense in 1985, after parliamentary democracy was restored to Uruguay.

The party participated in the 2004 presidential election. The Civic Union candidate Aldo Lamorte received 4,859 votes, placing 6th.

The party eventually merged into the National Party.

See also
Christian Democratic Party of Uruguay
Politics of Uruguay

Conservative parties in Uruguay
Political parties established in 1971
1971 establishments in Uruguay
Christian democratic parties in South America